Acrididea including the Acridomorpha is an infraorder of insects that describe the grasshoppers (thus also locusts) and ground-hoppers.  It contains a large majority of species in the suborder Caelifera and the taxon Acridomorpha may also be used, which excludes the Tetrigoidea.  Both names are derived from older texts, such as Imms, which placed the "short-horned grasshoppers" and locusts at the family level (Acrididae).  The study of grasshopper species is called acridology.

Acridomorpha
The Orthoptera Species File lists the following superfamilies: most families and species belong to the Acridoidea.
Acridoidea (MacLeay, 1821)
Eumastacoidea Burr, 1899
 Chorotypidae Stål, 1873
 Episactidae Burr, 1899
 Eumastacidae Burr, 1899
 Euschmidtiidae Rehn, 1948
 Mastacideidae Rehn, 1948
 Morabidae Rehn, 1948
 †Promastacidae Kevan & Wighton, 1981
 Thericleidae Burr, 1899
†Locustopsoidea Handlirsch, 1906
 †Bouretidae Martins-Neto, 2001
 †Eolocustopsidae Riek, 1976
 †Locustavidae Sharov, 1968
 †Locustopsidae Handlirsch, 1906
Pneumoroidea Thunberg, 1810 (monotypic)
Proscopioidea Serville, 1838 (monotypic) 
Pyrgomorphoidea Brunner von Wattenwyl, 1874 (monotypic)
Tanaoceroidea Rehn, 1948 (monotypic)
Trigonopterygoidea Walker, 1870
 Trigonopterygidae Walker, 1870
 Xyronotidae Bolívar, 1909

References

External links

Caelifera
Insect infraorders